Claude Duplain (born January 10, 1954) is a Canadian politician.

He was elected as the Member of Parliament for Portneuf, as the candidate of the Liberal Party of Canada, during the 37th Parliament (which sat from January 2001 through May 2004).  During that time he served as a member of the Standing Committee on Agriculture and Agri-Food and the Standing Committee on Canadian Heritage.

Claude Duplain has been president of Construction du Grand Portneuf, a general construction company, since 1996.  He is deeply involved in the economic development of the region of Portneuf.

From 1993 to 1996, he was president and shareholder of Construction du Grand Portneuf.  He was a project estimator and manager for the Joseph Linteau & Sons company (1992–1993) and also a manager for Magasin Rona in Saint-Raymond-de-Portneuf (1986–1992).  He worked as a designer for the architectural firm Beaudet, Nolet & Arcam Inc, and also for VariaHab which specializes in prefabricated houses.

He completed an architectural technical design course in 1971 after terminating his secondary education in 1970.  He took further training in marketing, accounting, data processing, first aid and English.

Duplain was elected as mayor of Saint-Raymond, Quebec in the 2021 mayoral election.

References

External links
 

1954 births
Living people
Liberal Party of Canada MPs
Members of the House of Commons of Canada from Quebec
21st-century Canadian politicians
Mayors of places in Quebec
People from Saint-Raymond, Quebec